Ball Hill is an area within the Stoke district of Coventry, West Midlands, England.  It is to the east of Coventry city centre.

Walsgrave Road is the main street that runs through Ball Hill, which is a name that primarily defines the shopping area extending from the brow of the hill down to the junction with Clay Lane and Brays Lane. The Walsgrave Road forms the main route out of Coventry's city centre towards Leicester and the north-east. It passes Gosford Green, approximately half a mile from the centre of Coventry, before passing through Ball Hill about 200 metres further east.

The name seems most likely to have derived from the Old Ball Hotel, still standing at the top of the hill. However, before the early 20th century, the hill was known as Stoke Knob and was mainly residential until, one by one, most of the dwellings were converted into shops.

The area was originally known as Stoke Knob. The 2-Tone Village and the Coventry Music Museum are located here.

Suburbs of Coventry